John Miles Verrall (1849 – 17 September 1921), also known as John Miles Verrell, was a 19th-century Member of Parliament in Canterbury, New Zealand. In his later years, he was known throughout the country as an advocate for a state bank.

Early life
Verrall was born in Lewes, Sussex, England, in 1849. He was a tenant farmer in his home country. He married Louisa Waters Aylwin, the daughter of John Aylwin, of Plumpton, Sussex. They emigrated to Queensland, Australia, in 1880, where he ran a cattle station with a partner. After a few years, he left his partner in charge of the cattle station and emigrated to New Zealand.

New Zealand

Verrall first settled in Ohoka, where he bought some land. In 1893, he sold up and moved to the nearby Swannanoa. During his time in Swannanoa, he advertised as a photographer using the surname Verrell.

Of the three candidates, he came last. Verrall was one of three candidates, and the result was very tight: he defeated Alfred Saunders by just two votes, and Marmaduke Dixon was only nine votes behind him. He represented the Ashley electorate to the end of the parliamentary term in 1890, when he retired.

As he did not even poll 10% of the vote, he lost his £10 deposit.

He died at his homestead in Swannanoa on 17 September 1921.

References

External links
Bio on early New Zealand photographers website

1849 births
1921 deaths
Members of the New Zealand House of Representatives
New Zealand photographers
Unsuccessful candidates in the 1887 New Zealand general election
New Zealand MPs for South Island electorates
People from Lewes
English emigrants to Australia
English emigrants to New Zealand
19th-century New Zealand politicians